José Enrique Cima Prado (born 16 June 1952) is a Spanish former cyclist.

Major results

1976
 1st Klasika Primavera
 1st Stages 5 & 6 Volta a Catalunya
 1st Stage 5b Tour of the Basque Country
1977
 1st Stage 4b Vuelta a Cantabria
 1st Prologue Vuelta a Levante
 1st Prologue Tour de Romandie
 1st Stage 2 Volta a Catalunya
 1st Stage 5b Tour of the Basque Country
 1st GP Vizcaya
 2nd Overall Vuelta a Cantabria
 2nd Prueba Villafranca de Ordizia
 2nd Klasika Primavera
 2nd Navarra
 2nd Overall Escalada a Montjuïc
1978
 1st Overall Setmana Catalana de Ciclisme
1st Stage 4
 1st Stages 2 & 17 Vuelta a España
 2nd Overall Tour of the Basque Country
1st Stage 5b
 3rd Overall Vuelta a los Valles Mineros
 3rd Overall Vuelta a Asturias
1st Stage 3
 3rd GP Navarra
1981
 3rd Overall Vuelta a Burgos

References

1952 births
Living people
Spanish male cyclists
People from Siero
Cyclists from Asturias